Kongsberg District Court is a district court located in Kongsberg, Norway.  It covers the municipalities of Kongsberg, Flesberg, Rollag and Nore og Uvdal  and is subordinate Borgarting Court of Appeal.

References

External links 
Official site 

Defunct district courts of Norway
Organisations based in Kongsberg